The Royal Hunt of the Sun is a 1969 British-American epic historical drama film based on the play of the same name by Peter Shaffer. It stars Robert Shaw as Francisco Pizarro and Christopher Plummer as the Inca leader Atahualpa. Plummer appeared in stage versions of the play before appearing in the film, which was shot in South America and Spain. The film and play are based on the Spanish conquest of Peru by Pizarro in 1530.

Plot
With a small rag-tag band of soldiers, Francisco Pizarro enters the Inca Empire and captures its leader, Atahualpa. Pizarro promises to free him in return for a golden ransom, but later finds himself conflicted between his desire to conquer and his friendship for his captive.

Cast
 Robert Shaw as Francisco Pizarro
 Christopher Plummer as Atahualpa
 Nigel Davenport as Hernando de Soto
 Leonard Whiting as Young Martin
 Michael Craig as Estete
 Andrew Keir as Valverde
 William Marlowe as Candia
 James Donald as King Carlos
 Alexander Davion as De Nizza
 Shmulik Kraus as Felipillo
 Percy Herbert as Diego
 David Bauer as Villac Umu
 Robert Rietti as Atahualpa (voice)

Reception
The film has a rating of 56% on Rotten Tomatoes.

Home media
The Royal Hunt of the Sun was released to DVD by CBS Home Entertainment on November 25, 2014 via its CBS MOD DVD-on-demand service.

See also
 List of American films of 1969

References

External links
 
 

1969 films
American historical drama films
British historical drama films
Cinema Center Films films
Films about conquistadors
Cultural depictions of Francisco Pizarro
Films based on plays by Peter Shaffer
Films set in the 1530s
Films set in Spain
Films set in Peru
Films set in the Inca Empire
Indigenous cinema in Latin America
1960s historical drama films
Age of Discovery films
Films shot in Almería
Films scored by Marc Wilkinson
1969 drama films
1960s English-language films
1960s American films
1960s British films
American epic films
British epic films